Carl Johan Erichsen (14 September 1879 – 10 November 1949) was a Norwegian military officer.

Personal life
Erichsen was born in Kristiania, a son of Hans Anton Erichsen and Karen Mathea Larsen. In 1919 he married Nina Wiese.

Career
Erichsen graduated as officer from the Norwegian Military Academy in 1901, and from the Norwegian Military College in 1905. He was promoted major in 1925, lieutenant colonel in 1929, and colonel and head of the 8th Infantry Regiment in Stavanger in 1930. From 1934 he was head of 6th Division in Harstad, with the rank of major general, and from 1939 he was head of 1st Division in Halden and commander at Fredriksten.

He died on 10 November 1949.

References

1879 births
1949 deaths
Military personnel from Oslo
Norwegian Military Academy alumni
Norwegian Military College alumni
Norwegian Army personnel of World War II
Norwegian Army generals